The 2020 Tennis Challenger Hamburg was a professional tennis tournament played on indoor hard courts. It was the second edition of the tournament which was part of the 2020 ATP Challenger Tour. It took place in Hamburg, Germany between 26 October and 1 November 2020.

Singles main-draw entrants

Seeds

 1 Rankings are as of 19 October 2020.

Other entrants
The following players received wildcards into the singles main draw:
  Daniel Altmaier
  Maximilian Marterer
  Daniel Masur

The following player received entry into the singles main draw using a protected ranking:
  Dustin Brown

The following players received entry into the singles main draw as special exempts:
  Benjamin Bonzi
  Borna Gojo

The following players received entry from the qualifying draw:
  Matthias Bachinger
  Tobias Kamke
  Pavel Kotov
  Stefano Napolitano

The following players received entry as lucky losers:
  Hugo Gaston
  Illya Marchenko

Champions

Singles

  Taro Daniel def.  Sebastian Ofner 6–1, 6–2.

Doubles

  Marc-Andrea Hüsler /  Kamil Majchrzak def.  Lloyd Glasspool /  Alex Lawson 6–3, 1–6, [20–18].

References

2020 ATP Challenger Tour
2020 in German tennis
October 2020 sports events in Germany
November 2020 sports events in Germany